Bob Muller (born c. 1932) is a former Republican member of the North Carolina General Assembly. He represented the 16th district. He was appointed to succeed Chris Millis, who resigned.

References

External links

Living people
1930s births
Republican Party members of the North Carolina House of Representatives
21st-century American politicians